Johnny McGrory (25 April 1915 in Glasgow – 25 September 1998) was a Scottish professional feather/light/welterweight boxer of the 1930s and 1940s who won the British Boxing Board of Control (BBBofC) Scottish Area featherweight title, BBBofC British featherweight title, and British Empire featherweight title, his professional fighting weight varied from , i.e.

References

External links

 Image - Johnny McGrory

1915 births
1998 deaths
Featherweight boxers
Lightweight boxers
Place of death missing
Scottish male boxers
Boxers from Glasgow
Welterweight boxers